Nikolaos Siranidis (Greek: Νικόλαος Σιρανίδης; born 26 February 1976) is a Greek diver who competed in the synchronised 3 metre springboard competition at the 2004 Summer Olympics. After a bizarre event where the Chinese, Russian and American teams failed, Siranidis won the gold medal together with Thomas Bimis. This was Greece's first-ever gold medal in diving and the hosts' first gold of the 2004 Athens Olympics, and the diver pair therefore became very popular in Greece.

Siranidis also competed in the 2000 Olympic Games in Sydney, where he placed 36th in the men's 3 metre springboard.

He was born in Athens.

References

External links 
 
 

1976 births
Living people
Sportspeople from Athens
Divers at the 1996 Summer Olympics
Divers at the 2000 Summer Olympics
Divers at the 2004 Summer Olympics
Greek male divers
Olympic gold medalists for Greece
Olympic divers of Greece
Olympic medalists in diving
Medalists at the 2004 Summer Olympics